Union Vale is a town in Dutchess County, New York, United States. The population was 4,558 at the 2020 census. 

The town is in the south-central part of the county. It is part of the Poughkeepsie–Newburgh–Middletown, NY Metropolitan Statistical Area as well as the larger New York–Newark–Bridgeport, NY-NJ-CT-PA Combined Statistical Area.

History

The region was originally part of the Beekman Patent. The town was first settled circa 1716, and was formed in 1827 from the towns of Beekman and LaGrange.

Geography

The towns adjacent to Union Vale are Beekman to the south, LaGrange to the west, Washington to the north, and Dover to the east.

New York State Route 55 runs through the southwestern part of the town.

Sky Acres Airport, a general aviation facility, is located in the northwestern part of the town.

Parks and recreation
Union Vale has two town parks, Tymor Park and Frederick E. Godfrey Memorial Park.

There is a private golf course, The Links at Union Vale, on the western side of the town.

Demographics

As of the census of 2000, there were 4,546 people, 1,359 households, and 1,141 families residing in the town.  The population density was 120.6 people per square mile (46.6/km2).  There were 1,464 housing units at an average density of 38.8 per square mile (15.0/km2).  The racial makeup of the town was 94.24% white, 2.35% African American, 0.11% Native American, 1.19% Asian, 0.04% Pacific Islander, 1.03% from other races, and 1.03% from two or more races. Hispanic or Latino of any race were 3.43% of the population.

There were 1,359 households, out of which 47.0% had children under the age of 18 living with them, 75.9% were married couples living together, 5.6% had a female householder with no husband present, and 16.0% were non-families. 12.9% of all households were made up of individuals, and 4.9% had someone living alone who was 65 years of age or older.  The average household size was 3.10 and the average family size was 3.40.

In the town, the population was spread out, with 28.9% under the age of 18, 5.5% from 18 to 24, 30.1% from 25 to 44, 25.6% from 45 to 64, and 9.9% who were 65 years of age or older.  The median age was 38 years. For every 100 females, there were 100.7 males.  For every 100 females age 18 and over, there were 100.3 males.

The median income for a household in the town was $70,500, and the median income for a family was $72,697. Males had a median income of $51,382 versus $29,643 for females. The per capita income for the town was $24,535.  About 0.8% of families and 2.9% of the population were below the poverty line, including 1.7% of those under age 18 and none of those age 65 or over.

Communities and locations in Union Vale
Camby – A location in the northeastern part of the town.
Chestnut Ridge – A location at the eastern town line.
Clove – A  hamlet near the town center.
Clove Mountain – An elevation west of Clove village.
Crouses Store – A location in the southwestern section  of the town.
LaGrangeville or (La Grangeville) – A hamlet in the southwestern corner of the town that Union Vale shares with the towns of LaGrange and Beekman. With the zip code of 12540.
Hoxie Corner – A location southwest of Verbank.
North Clove – A location northeast of Clove.
Pleasant Ridge – A location in the southeastern part of the town.
Verbank – A hamlet near the northern town line.
Verbank Village – A hamlet west of Verbank.

Oswego
Oswego is a former hamlet, later a ghost town, in the northwestern part of the town, north of Lagrangeville and south of Verbank, now part of the hamlet of Moores Mills, shared with the town of LaGrange. It is located directly southeast of Sky Acres airport. A historic marker set by the state government marks the spot of the former hamlet. The Oswego Meeting House and Friends' Cemetery was listed on the National Register of Historic Places in 1989.

This ghost town shares a name with a city in the northern part of the state,  Oswego.

References

External links

Town of Union Vale official website

Poughkeepsie–Newburgh–Middletown metropolitan area
Towns in Dutchess County, New York
Towns in the New York metropolitan area